Paramesha Panwala is a 2008 Kannada-language film directed by Mahesh Babu, and produced by Aditya Babu, whilst the music was composed by V. Harikrishna. The film stars Shiva Rajkumar and Surveen Chawla. It was released nationwide on 5 December 2008.

Plot 
Paramesha dearly loves his sister and would turn the world upside down for her happiness. When a local gangster vows to kill his sister's husband, Paramesha is willing to stop him at all costs.

Cast
Shiva Rajkumar as Paramesha
Surveen Chawla as Shruti
Sonu
 Srinivasamurthy
 Ashish Vidyarthi as Don
 Chitra Shenoy
 Akul Balaji
 Rekha 
 Sadhu Kokila 
 Sharan

Reception
This movie also suffered the same fate as of other recent movies by Shivaraj Kumar. Even though the film was hyped as usual, it did not fare well in box office.

Critical response 

R G Vijayasarathy of Rediff.com scored the film at 2.5 out of 5 stars and wrote "Shivaraj Kumar is lively and dances very well in the film. But it is Rao and Sadhu who walk away with the honours. The film's other comedian Sharan has limited scope. Heroine Surveen Chawla looks good in dance sequences. Ashish Vidyarthi, as the villain,is monotonous. PP is sans logic but is still an enjoyable fare".

Music
The film has five songs composed by V. Harikrishna with the lyrics penned by V. Nagendra Prasad and Kaviraj. The audio of the film released on 10 November 2008, at Green House, Bangalore. Album was released by Raghavendra Rajkumar and journalist P.G. Srinivasamurthy.

References

External links
Paramesha Panwala movie gallery
 

2000s Kannada-language films
2008 films
Films scored by V. Harikrishna
Films directed by Mahesh Babu (director)